Matthew Helderman (born 1987) is an American film producer. He is known for his work in 3022, The Pale Door, Cosmic Sin, Street Gang: How We Got to Sesame Street, and Redemption Day.

Early life and career
Helderman was born in 1987 in Connecticut, U.S. He spent his early life in Fairfield, Connecticut. He was educated at The Frederick Gunn School. For his college education, he attended Lake Forest College and graduated with a bachelor's of arts degree in 2011.

In 2010, Helderman founded Buffalo 8 while an undergraduate student at Lake Forest College for the production of the feature film The Alumni Chapter before re-locating the company to Beverly Hills following his graduation.

In 2013, Helderman co-founded BondIt Media Capital with partner Luke Taylor. He is also the founder of a production company called Buffalo 8.

In 2017, Helderman and Taylor bought ABS Entertainment Payroll.

In 2019, Helderman uncovered never before heard audio files and never before seen case files in connection with the Jeffrey Dahmer murder trials. Helderman and Buffalo 8 partnered with Emmy Award winning director Joe Berlinger to oversee creative direction, Radical Media who then oversaw production of the Conversations With a Killer series with Helderman and Buffalo 8 Executive Producing.

Filmography 
 The Alumni Chapter (2011)
 Big Kill (2019)
 Trauma Center (2019)
 3022 (2019)
 Becky (2020)
 Indigo Valley (2020)
 Hooking Up (2020)
 The Reckoning (2020)
 The Legion (2020)
 American Siege (2020)
 Seized (2020)
 The Pale Door (2020)
 Givers of Death (2020)
 Cosmic Sin (2021)
 Apex (2021)
 Locked In (2021)
 Midnight in the Switchgrass (2021)
 Out of Death (2021)
 The Dead of Night (2021)
 Cosmic Sin (2021)
 Body Brokers (2021)
 Dual (2021)
 Panama (2021)
 The Commando (2021)
 Ida Red (2021)
 Street Gang: How We Got to Sesame Street (2021)
 Redemption Day (2021)
 The Fallout (2021)
 Book of Love (2022)
 Conversations with a Killer (2022)

References 

Living people
American film producers
Lake Forest College alumni
1987 births